Paphiopedilum malipoense is a species of orchid commonly known as the jade slipper orchid. This hemicryptophyte plant starts blooming in the spring time and has one flower per inflorescence.  The plant grows in intermediate to cool conditions. Its flowers have a raspberry fragrance.

Distribution 
Paphiopedilum malipoense is found in northern Vietnam and southern China at the elevation of 570 to 1600 meters. It is found growing on limestone cliffs with leaf litter. The area where this plant is found is subjected to heavy fog in the winter and rain in the early spring and summer.

Culture 
To induce blooming, water less and keep cool during the winter. High amounts of light will cause the plant to flower more frequently. This plant does best in wet areas and prefers moss near the roots. Plants can be potted in a mix that contains gravel, bark and perlite. Keep humidity at 60 to 80%. Plants should be kept in areas with moderate lighting.

Varieties and forms 
 Paphiopedilum malipoense var. alba. Light green flower.
 Paphiopedilum malipoense var. angustatum, found in Yunnan (China)
 Paphiopedilum malipoense var. aureum
 Paphiopedilum malipoense f./var. concolor, found in Yunnan (China)
 Paphiopedilum malipoense var. hiepii
 Paphiopedilum malipoense var. jackii (H.S.Hua) Aver., found in  southeastern Yunnan (China) to northern Vietnam. Formerly P. jackii.
 Paphiopedilum malipoense var. malipoense, found from southeastern Yunnan, southwestern Guizhou and southwestern Guangxi (China) to northern Vietnam. Includes f. tonnianum and f. virescens.

References

External links 

malipoense
Flora of Guangxi
Orchids of Guizhou
Orchids of Yunnan
Orchids of Vietnam